Chicken scratch may refer to:

 Chicken scratch or waila music of the Tohono O'odham people of Arizona and Northern Mexico
 Chicken scratch (food), chicken feed
 "Chicken scratch embroidery" is a form of cross-stitch embroidery done on gingham fabric, also known as "depression lace" or "snowflaking". 
 Chicken scratch guitar is a style of rhythm guitar playing associated with funk music. 
 Chicken scratching may also refer to penmanship that is very close to illegible.